Percy Hynes White  (born October 8, 2001) is a Canadian actor. He is known for his roles in films such as Edge of Winter and A Christmas Horror Story, for his role in the television series Between, and for his starring role as Andy Strucker in The Gifted and, as of 2022, stars as Xavier Thorpe in the Netflix comedy horror series Wednesday.

Early life
Hynes White is the son of Joel Thomas Hynes, a writer, actor and director, and Sherry White, a writer and actress. Hynes White studied for two years at the performing arts group in his hometown of St. John's.

Career
Hynes White's first role was Keith in the film Down to the Dirt.. In 2022 he played the role of Xavier Thorpe in the series Wednesday.

Filmography

Film

Television

Accolades

References

External links

2001 births
Living people
21st-century Canadian male actors
Canadian male child actors
Canadian male film actors
Canadian male television actors
Male actors from Newfoundland and Labrador